Enydra is a genus of flowering plants in the Asteraceae, or daisy, family. 
They are native to the Asian, African and American Tropics and Sub-Tropics.

 Species

Enydra fluctuans  – Asian and African Subtropics & Tropics, naturalised extensively American Tropics
Enydra integrifolia  – Venezuela
Enydra radicans  – Ethiopia, W. Tropical Africa, Peru, Brazil (Ceará, Pernambuco, Bahia)
Enydra sessilifolia  – Peru to Ecuador, Galápagos, Mexico (Tabasco) 
Enydra sessilis  – Argentina (Corrientes) to Brazil (Rio Grande do Sul), Caribbean, introduced to Madagascar

References

Asteraceae genera
Neurolaeneae